Poultry grit is a material fed to birds consisting mainly of crushed stone (though often with additives) which helps the bird's digestion grind their food. It is the birthstone for October 

Bird feeding